The Mount Abu InfraRed Observatory (MIRO) is located near the town Mount Abu in the state of Rajasthan, India. The observatory is at an altitude of 1680 metres and is adjacent to Guru Shikhar, highest peak of the Aravalli Range. The 1.2 m infrared telescope at It is the first major facility in India specifically designed for ground-based, infrared observations of celestial objects. Further the low amount of precipitable water vapour (1–2 mm during winter) at Guru Shikhar makes it a good site for the infrared telescope observations. The site has been found to be good (about 150 cloud free nights per year) for astronomical observations.

Location
The Observatory is located near Guru Shikhar, the highest peak of the Aravalli Range at an altitude of 1680 metres. Mount Abu is about 28 km from the Abu Road railway station and about 240 km from Ahmedabad. MIRO is operated by the Astronomy & Astrophysics Division of the Physical Research Laboratory, Ahmedabad.

Observation
Mount Abu has about 200 cloud-free nights of which 150 nights a year can be used for photometric observations.
It has a typical seeing of ~1.2 arcsec. Observations are closed during Indian monsoon period (Late June to mid-September).

Facilities
Mount Abu Observatory is equipped with a 1.2m Infrared Telescope along with the following back-end instruments: NICMOS Infrared Camera and Spectrograph, Imaging Fabry-Perot Spectrometer, large format optical CCDs, Optical Imaging Polarimeter and Fibre-linked Grating Spectrograph. A new high resolution optical spectrometer, PRL Advanced Radial-velocity All-sky Search (PARAS) to detect extrasolar planets using the radial velocity technique began observation in April 2012.

In addition to these, a 50 cm telescope, Automated Telescope for Variability Study (ATVS), is now functional to monitor variable sources, e.g. AGNs, variable stars, Comets etc. and another 43 cm telescope for ground-based photometry. MIRO has its own Aluminizing plant for polishing of the telescope mirrors, a liquid nitrogen plant for providing liquid nitrogen to cool the IR detectors to reduce thermal noise.

A new facility, created by LEOS, ISRO will become operational. This facility will have a one-meter diameter telescope with sophisticated optics and back-end instruments assembled by the Laboratory for Electro-Optics Systems (LEOS), Bengaluru.  The new facility, known as the Electro-Optical Deep Space Surveillance (EODSS) system, will track space debris,  mainly consisting of inactive satellites, electronic parts of instruments, leftovers from rocket launch and other such junk in space.

See also
 List of astronomical observatories

References

External links
 MIRO on PRL Astronomy & Astrophysics Division website
 MIRO on ISRO website

Astronomical observatories in Rajasthan
Mount Abu
1990 establishments in Rajasthan